WRCE (1450 kHz, "WRCE News from the Center") is an AM radio station broadcasting a news and progressive talk format. Licensed to Richland Center, Wisconsin, United States, the station is currently owned by Civic Media, through licensee Civic Media, Inc.

In September 2022, WRCE (formerly WRCO-AM) changed its format from standards to progressive talk as "News from the Center". With the format change WRCE introduced a new locally produced morning show hosted by Todd Albaugh. WRCE also covers local high school sports play by play and is an affiliate of the Wisconsin Badgers football and basketball radio networks. One of the first interviews on the new format was an interview of longtime local politician Dale Schultz.

References

External links

RCE
News and talk radio stations in the United States
Richland County, Wisconsin
Radio stations established in 1949
1949 establishments in Wisconsin
Progressive talk radio